The All-Ireland Senior B Hurling Championship of 1982 was the ninth staging of Ireland's secondary hurling knock-out competition.  Antrim won the championship, beating London 2-16 to 2-14 in the final at the Emerald GAA Grounds, Ruislip.

References

 Donegan, Des, The Complete Handbook of Gaelic Games (DBA Publications Limited, 2005).

1982
1982 in Northern Ireland sport
B